Synanthedon mesiaeformis is a moth of the family Sesiidae. It is found in France, Spain, Lithuania, Poland, the Czech Republic, most of the Balkan Peninsula, Finland, Russia and Asia Minor. The species prefers solitary trees on meadows, in parks and along streams.

The wingspan is 19–31 mm. Adults are on wing from the second half of May to the end of July.

The larvae feed on Alnus glutinosa. The larva develops in somewhat winding, flat tunnels between the bark and the wood of the host plant. Pupation takes place in a dense cocoon in the bark. The life cycle takes two to three years.

References

Moths described in 1846
Sesiidae
Moths of Europe